Scotinotylus alpigena is a species of sheet weaver found in the Palearctic. It was described by L. Koch in 1869.

References

Linyphiidae
Spiders of Europe
Palearctic spiders
Spiders described in 1869